The 1903 Northern Illinois State Normal football team represented Northern Illinois State Normal College as an independent in the 1903 college football season. They were led by fifth-year head coach John A. H. Keith and played their home games at Glidden Field, located on the east end of campus. The team finished the season with a 4–2 record. Floyd Ritzman and Donald Kays were the team's co-captains.

Schedule

Notes

References

Northern Illinois State
Northern Illinois Huskies football seasons
Northern Illinois State Normal football